Elordi is a surname. Notable people with the surname include:

 Alejandro Elordi (born 1894), Argentine footballer
 Jacob Elordi (born 1997), Australian actor